The Sri Lanka Air Force 50th Anniversary Medal (Sinhala: ශ්‍රී ලංකා ගුවන් හමුදා 50වන සංවත්සර පදක්කම  Śrī Laṃkā guwan hamudā panasvana sangwathsara padakkama) was awarded to all ranks of both the regular- and volunteer forces of the Sri Lanka Air Force, as well as civilians employed within it serving on 2 March 2001, the year of the 50th anniversary of the Air Force.

External links
Sri Lanka Air Force
Ministry of Defence : Sri Lanka

References

Military awards and decorations of Sri Lanka
Awards established in 2001